The Knoxville Invitational was a golf tournament on the PGA Tour that was held in Knoxville, Tennessee from 1944 to 1946. The 1944 event was held at Whittle Springs Golf Course while those in 1945 and 1946 were held at the Holston Hills Country Club. The 7,009-yard course opened in 1927 and was designed by Donald Ross.

Byron Nelson won in 1944 and retained the title during his record-setting year of 18 wins including 11 consecutively. The 1946 event was won by Herman Keiser.

Winners

References

Former PGA Tour events
Golf in Tennessee
Sports in Knoxville, Tennessee